Frank Scott Albinder is a conductor of male choral music. A former director of Chanticleer, Albinder currently conducts the Washington Men's Camerata, the Woodley Ensemble, and the Virginia Glee Club, and is president of Intercollegiate Men's Choruses, Inc., a national association of men's choruses. Albinder designed the concept and chose the repertoire for Chanticleer's Grammy Award winning album Colors of Love. Albinder holds degrees in conducting and vocal performance. Perhaps his best known work is the vocal solo of Loch Lomond, featured on the Chanticleer album Wondrous Love. He is a past president of the Alumni Association of Pomona College in Claremont, California.  Albinder lives and works primarily in the District of Columbia.

Positions held
 American Choral Directors Association; past National Repertoire and Standards Chair for Male Choirs
 President of Intercollegiate Men's Choruses, Inc.
 Boston Camerata; Vocalist
 Chanticleer; Associate Conductor, Acting Director, Vocalist
 ChoralNet; Vice President
 The Church of the Presidents; Vocalist, Music Staff
 Google Glass Explorer
 Concord Ensemble; Vocalist
 Davidson College; Director of Choral Activities
 Robert Shaw Festival Singers; Vocalist
 Virginia Glee Club at the University of Virginia; Conductor (2003 - Present)
 Washington Bach Consort; Vocalist
 Washington Men's Camerata; Music Director (1999 - Present)
 Woodley Ensemble; Music Director
 National Board Member, National Collegiate Choral Organization

References

External links
Profile on ChoralNet.org

American choral conductors
American male conductors (music)
Living people
Year of birth missing (living people)
21st-century American conductors (music)
21st-century American male musicians
Pomona College alumni